Amadej Maroša (born 7 February 1994) is a Slovenian professional footballer who plays as a forward for Ekstraklasa club Górnik Zabrze.

Career 
On 25 November 2021, Maroša scored the winning goal in stoppage time for Mura in a 2–1 UEFA Europa Conference League win over Tottenham Hotspur.

Honours
Mura
Slovenian PrvaLiga: 2020–21
Slovenian Cup: 2019–20
Slovenian Second League: 2017–18

References

External links
Amadej Maroša at NZS 
Amadej Maroša at ÖFB 

1994 births
Living people
People from Murska Sobota
Slovenian footballers
Association football forwards
ND Mura 05 players
NŠ Mura players
AEL Limassol players
Górnik Zabrze players
Slovenian Second League players
Slovenian PrvaLiga players
Cypriot First Division players
Ekstraklasa players
Slovenian expatriate footballers
Expatriate footballers in Austria
Slovenian expatriate sportspeople in Austria
Expatriate footballers in Cyprus
Slovenian expatriate sportspeople in Cyprus
Expatriate footballers in Poland
Slovenian expatriate sportspeople in Poland